Ramón Darío Ábila (born 14 October 1989) is an Argentine professional footballer who plays as a forward for Colón. He is commonly known by the Argentine media as "Wanchope."

Career
Ábila came from the youth divisions of Instituto Atlético Central Córdoba, made his professional debut at the Primera B Nacional in 2008. He was transferred to Sarmiento de Junín and then Deportivo Morón, teams from the Argentina soccer's third division, to returns to Instituto in 2013.

Later he signed by Huracán where he was one of top scorers at Copa Sudamericana 2015 and he was part of the Huracán squad which won the 2013–14 Copa Argentina and 2014 Supercopa Argentina.

On 22 June 2016, Ábila was signed by Cruzeiro on a four-year contract for a transfer fee of US$4 million.

Boca Juniors
He was transferred to Boca at January 2018 and he scored one goal at the 2018 Copa Libertadores first leg, a tie 2-2 between Boca and River at La Bombonera on 11 November 2018.

Minnesota United
On 7 April 2021, Major League Soccer side Minnesota United FC acquired Ábila on loan with an option to purchase using Targeted Allocation Money.

He scored his first MLS goal on May 12, 2021 at a home match against the Vancouver Whitecaps. He lifted his jersey in celebration to reveal a shirt with a photo of his brother, Gaston, who had died of suicide the year prior.

D.C. United 
On 11 August 2021, D.C. United acquired Ábila on another loan off of waivers. He scored his first goal for the club on 18 August, in a 2–3 loss against the New England Revolution. Following the 2021 season, Ábila's contract option was declined by D.C. United.

Career statistics

Honours
Sarmiento (J)
Primera B Metropolitana: 2011–12

Huracán
Copa Argentina: 2013–14
Supercopa Argentina: 2014

Cruzeiro
Copa do Brasil: 2017

Boca Juniors
Primera División: 2017–18, 2019–20
Copa de la Liga Profesional: 2020
Supercopa Argentina: 2018

References

External links

1989 births
Living people
Argentine footballers
Argentine expatriate footballers
Footballers from Córdoba, Argentina
Association football forwards
Instituto footballers
Club Atlético Sarmiento footballers
Deportivo Morón footballers
Club Atlético Huracán footballers
Boca Juniors footballers
Cruzeiro Esporte Clube players
Minnesota United FC players
D.C. United players
Club Atlético Colón footballers
Argentine Primera División players
Primera Nacional players
Primera B Metropolitana players
Campeonato Brasileiro Série A players
Argentine expatriate sportspeople in the United States
Argentine expatriate sportspeople in Brazil
Expatriate soccer players in the United States
Expatriate footballers in Brazil
Major League Soccer players